The Heroes (Persian: پهلوانان, romanized: Pahlevānān, meaning The Champions) is an Iranian animated television series written and directed by Siavash Zarrinabadi and produced by Alireza Golpayegani from Harekat-e Kelidi Company and Saba Animation Center. This series is also dubbed in Arabic and Turkish. The first season aired in March 2008 on IRIB TV2 and the last season aired in April 2022 on IRIB TV1. This series was rebroadcast many times by IRIB Pooya & Nahal. The series focuses on fight of Pourya-ye Vali's students against Eskandar Khan and admonishes of Pourya-ye Vali in 13th century.

Plot
 
Pahlavan Pourya-ye Vali, a blacksmith and master of Pahlevan Haydar Khorasani's Zoorkhaneh, with the ingenuity and cooperation of his students: Pahlavan Yavar, who is like Pouria in blacksmithing, Pahlavan Safi, who was formerly one of the ruling armies of Balkh, has now engaged in felt-making and Pahlavan Mofrad, who was Ayyar, has now set up a barber shop in the city square, fights against the trickery of Eskandar Khan, the greedy and ambitious Darughachi of the city. The lazy and stingy king of city is also present in the series. The story of this collection takes place in the city of Khwarazm, one of the cities of Greater Khorasan, in the 13th century. Each episode has a separate story that ends in the same episode.

Voice cast
 Ali Hemat Momivand as Eskandar
 Bijan Ali Mohammadi as Pourya-ye Vali(Season 1,2,3,4)
 Amir Mohammad Samsami as Yavar
 Zafar Geraei as Mofrad(Season 1,2,3,4)
 Hamidreza Ashtianipour as Safi and Pourya-ye Vali(Season 5)
 Shahrouz Malekarayi as Teymour(Season 1,2,3,4)
 Touraj Nasr as Tooti and Toghrol
 Saeid Sheikh Zadeh as Mofrad(Season 5)
 Shahrad Banki as Teymour(Season 5)
 Mina Ghiaspour as Golrokh
 Hossein Khodadad Beygi
 Valiollah  Momeni  as Gholam(Season 1,2)
 Siamak Atlasi as Khajeh
 Akbar Manani
 Zhila Ashkan
 Shayesteh Tajbakhsh
 Hadi Jalili
 Amir Manouchehri
 Ali Asghar Rezaeinik
 Naser Khishtandar
 Maryam Nouri Derakhshan
 Mojtaba Fathollahi
 Hasan Kakhi

Production
Alireza Golpayegani described the production of the first season as follows:

Siavash Zarrinabadi stated the reason for choosing to make the series 2D:

Episode list

Season 1

Season 2

Season 3

Season 4

Season 5

Reception

Awards
 The award for the best director of the series in the third Jam-e-Jam Television Festival (Siavash Zarrinabadi)

Notes

References

External links
 
The Heroes on Harekat-e Kelidi website
The Heroes on Saba Animation Center
 The Heroes in Telewebion Plus

Iranian animated television series
Persian-language television shows
2008 television series debuts
Television series set in the 13th century
Animation based on real people